MV Pelagitis is a roll-on/roll-off (Ro-Ro) ferry formerly operated by Marine Atlantic from North Sydney, Nova Scotia to Channel-Port aux Basques, Newfoundland, Canada. The vessel was completed in 1978 by Hyundai Shipbuilding Company Limited in and delivered to the Stena Line which operates in Northern Europe. She was sold on 12 March 2010   and given her current name Pelagitis.

Throughout her career, the vessel sailed under the names Atlantic Freighter, Merzario Grecia, Stena Grecia, and Tor Felicia.

Operation
Loading and unloading the vessel each take over three hours.  Eight trailers are loaded at one time using a "yard tractor train system". The vessel represented 19.6 percent of Marine Atlantic's fleet in 2005.

Asbestos risk
In 1990 asbestos was found in use on the vessel. Management made the decision to encapsulate the asbestos. In November 2007, 60 workers on Atlantic Freighter were told they should be tested for asbestos exposure.

Gulf War service
Atlantic Freighter was chartered by the United States Military Sealift Command in December 1990, and served two supply missions to the Persian Gulf during the Gulf War.  The vessel was captained by Neil Hillier, and crewed by 25 volunteers. Fisheries and Oceans Minister, Fred Mifflin was credited with five years of efforts to secure the right for the crew to wear the United States Merchant Marine Expeditionary Award.

References

Ferries of Newfoundland and Labrador
Ferries of Nova Scotia
Marine Atlantic
Ships built by Hyundai Heavy Industries Group
1977 ships